Life Is Beautiful (Chinese: 初一的心愿) is a Singaporean Chinese drama produced by MediaCorp Channel 8. The drama is a collaboration between MediaCorp and the National Kidney Foundation (NKF), which hopes to raise awareness of kidney-related diseases. A lensing ceremony was held on 30 June 2014. The show aired at 9pm on weekdays and had a repeat telecast at 8am the following day. It will be aired from 5 March 2015. The Series is repeated at 12pm to 2pm on Channel 8 on Sunday on 10 June 2018 to 12 August 2018.

No new episodes were aired between 23 and 27 March 2015 during the period of National Mourning.

Synopsis
Shen Chuyi (Rui En) is a happy-go-lucky girl who, since she was a child, has seen how much her father has suffered from kidney dialysis. Thus, she has cultivated the good habit of eating healthily, and often reminds people around her to maintain a healthy diet. Chuyi works in the events company of Yu Yang (Pierre Png), the fiancé of her bosom friend, Cai Jiayi. The three of them volunteer regularly in the charity activities of NKF.

Sadly, when Chuyi grown older, she realised that she has some conditions that is similar to that of her father's. Chuyi was worried if she have kidney disease, like her father. After the checkup, Chuyi is diagnosed with acute kidney disease. Chuyi’s boyfriend, Ding Zhanpeng (Allen Chen), leaves her as his parents disapprove them from being together. Chuyi's mother, Chen Miaoyu (Aileen Tan) is devastated and tries to donate her kidney to save Chuyi but is unable to do so because of her own health problems. Jiayi cannot bear to see Chuyi tormented by kidney disease, she decides to donate a kidney to her. Chuyi is adamant about refusing it, not to mention that Jiayi’s parents oppose the decision vehemently. Before Jiayi manages to convince her parents, she is killed in a car accident at an early age. In accordance with the organ pledge form that she had signed before her death, Jiayi’s kidney is donated to Chuyi….

After being given a new lease of life, Chuyi and Junkai (Dasmond Koh), a fellow kidney patient, set up a mutual support group with several other patients. A strong and cohesive group, they meet regularly for activities and exercises every week.

Ever since Jiayi died, the Cai family has been living in grief. Out of gratitude and her wish to take care of Jiayi’s parents, Chuyi begins to associate with the family. She becomes “acquainted with” 85-kg Cai Jiajia (Ya Hui) who indulges in binge eating, and Jiayi’s parents, Cai Qingde (Chen Shucheng) and Huang Cuijiao (Lin Meijiao). Having had a taste of the lifestyle and eating habits of the family, Chuyi tries to change their extremely unhealthy ways. Ever since Qingde and Cuijiao lost their beloved daughter, they have been wallowing in misery. When Chuyi enters their lives, they discover that she shares similar characteristics with Jiayi. For some strange reasons, they develop a fondness for her, and started to regard Chuyi as their daughter. Jiajia feels indignant that Chuyi means more to her parents than she does….

As for Yu Yang, Jiayi’s death drives him to shut himself away. He furiously buries himself in work. Yu Yang has a bosom friend, Lin Zhongken (Jeffrey Xu). He counsels Yu Yang to accept the truth that Jiayi is gone, and points out that it is unrealistic for him to let his feelings die off.

Zhongken is an instructor at a fitness academy who has a psychological issue with “complete honesty”; he suffocates for no reason the moment he tells a lie. Through Yu Yang, Zhongken gets to know Jiajia. His inability to tell lies leads to several unpleasant encounters with her, but deep down, he develops feelings for Jiajia.

Zhongken spares no effort in helping Jiajia to lose weight, and reveals his love for her. Jiajia naturally refuses to believe him, let alone accept his love. She finds that the two of them are incompatible. Accepting Zhongken will only put undue pressure on herself. Zhongken feels helpless.

Chuyi is well aware of the pain that Jiayi’s death has inflicted on Yu Yang. In helping Yu Yang to emerge from his emotional abyss, the two of them unknowingly develop feelings for each other. Unexpectedly, Chuyi meets Zhanpeng, her former boyfriend. It turns out that after jilting Chuyi, he married Simone, his new girlfriend and had a son with her. Unfortunately, the baby was born with a heart condition. Simone deserted both of them, leaving Zhanpeng to take care of their ailing child singlehandedly. Upon learning the situation, Chuyi selflessly extends a helping hand and shows concern for father and son. Zhanpeng regrets his stupid decision to leave Chuyi. His love for her is rekindled.

At the same time, Chuyi discovers that a client of hers, Lin Shaoping (Hong Huifang) is actually Yu Yang’s mother who abandoned him when he was a child. Yu Yang was six when his mother left him to elope with her boyfriend. The sight of his devastated and humiliated father made Yu Yang hate her to the core. After marrying her boyfriend, Shaoping built up a furniture empire. The remorse she feels towards her son increases by the day. By chance, she finds out about his events company. She conceals her identity and becomes a client of the company. Chuyi finds out the secret but promises Shaoping that she will keep the truth from Yu Yang. She often creates opportunities for mother and son to spend time together. Shaoping, stricken with heart disease, dies with regret. As Yu Yang feels guilty about behaving callously towards his mother, he is reluctant to inherit the fortune she has left for him. In the end, he uses part of it to set up a charity foundation in his mother’s name…

Jiajia’s weight problem becomes serious and she has a bad fall one day. With her legs rendered immobile, it makes her even more discouraged. Yu Yang hopes that Jiajia will take good care of her health for the sake of her parents. Jiajia finally overcomes her resentment towards Chuyi and accepts help from both of them by embarking on a health regimen of diet and exercise…. Love grows between Yu Yang and Chuyi as they spend more and more time together. Slowly but surely, Chuyi enters Yu Yang’s life. Be it in his daily activities or areas of work, Chuyi plays an indispensable role. Yu Yang cannot help but fear that he is falling for her so naturally.  He is afraid of betraying the late Jiayi and forgetting her by loving Chuyi. He forces himself to curb his feelings. Will Yu Yang be able to open his heart to embrace Chuyi’s love?

On the other hand, Zhanpeng, who is increasingly reliant on Chuyi, is doing his best to touch her heart. He pleads with her to renew their relationship, and to take care of his sickly son together. Chuyi is hesitant. Should she accept Zhanpeng?

Cast

Main cast

Supporting cast

OST Soundtrack

Trivia
The theme song performer, Lin Si Tong, served as Pierre Png and Dasmond Koh's music instructor for the series. She had guided their music scenes during the drama shoot, and also produced their versions of her songs for the series in the recording studio.
Rui En's second drama collaboration with Dasmond Koh after A Toast of Love.
Esther Yang's first Singaporean drama series.
The series was repeated at 8am. 
NKF quick facts are shared at the end of each episode. This is the eighth series to have no commentaries for News Tonight.
The Series repeat its telecast on Channel 8 at 5.30pm.
This series started its rerun on Saturdays and Sundays at 7:30am to 9:30am on 27 Nov 2021.

Awards & Nominations
Life Is Beautiful was nominated for only one technical award in Star Awards 2016. Lim Hap Choon was nominated for Best Cameraman, but lost to Steve Wong Kwok Chung from The Journey: Our Homeland.

Star Awards 2016

Fame Awards 2016

See also
List of programmes broadcast by Mediacorp Channel 8
List of Life Is Beautiful episodes
National Kidney Foundation Singapore

References

Singapore Chinese dramas
2015 Singaporean television series debuts
2015 Singaporean television series endings
Channel 8 (Singapore) original programming